W.R. (Bud) Jardine (born 31 May 1935) was a Progressive Conservative party member of the House of Commons of Canada. He was a naval officer by career.

Born in Chatham, New Brunswick, Jardine was elected at Northumberland—Miramichi electoral district in the 1984 federal election, thus he served in the 33rd Canadian Parliament. He was defeated in the 1988 federal election by Maurice Dionne of the Liberal party.

External links
 

1935 births
Living people
Members of the House of Commons of Canada from New Brunswick
Progressive Conservative Party of Canada MPs